The Dokumacılar (English: Weavers) was a Turkish organisation linked to the Islamic State of Iraq and the Levant (ISIL) that specifically targeted the Kurdish People's Protection Units (YPG) that were fighting against ISIL in the Syrian Civil War. The organisation, thought to have been formed of around 60 Turkish militants who joined ISIL, was linked to both the 2015 Diyarbakır rally bombings that killed 4 people and the 2015 Suruç bombing that killed 32 people.

The Dokumacılar numbered in the 60-70s, most of which were Turkish citizens from Adıyaman Province who joined ISIL. The group allegedly participated in the unsuccessful fight against the YPG forces during the offensive against the town of Tell Abyad in Syria.

Formation
The Dokumacılar are allegedly formed by around 60 or 70 Turkish citizens from Adıyaman Province, who crossed the Turkish-Syrian border to receive training in ISIL camps. The group also allegedly had links with Turkish customs officials at border gates on the border.

Alleged attacks

Offensive on Tell Abyad

Reports claim that the Dokumacılar were part of the ISIL offensive against the Syrian city of Tell Abyad in 2015, where the group allegedly suffered heavy casualties. The group's military commander was reported to have been killed by Kurdish People's Protection Units (YPG) fighters during the offensive, with the final YPG victory against ISIL's military forces causing the Dokumacılar to retreat and cross the border back into Turkey.

HDP Diyarbakır rally bombings

During an electoral rally held in Diyarbakır by the pro-Kurdish Peoples' Democratic Party (HDP) just 48 hours before the Turkish general election of June 2015, two bombs exploded just before the party chairman Selahattin Demirtaş was about to make a speech. The attack killed 4 people and injured over 100 more, with the HDP accusing ISIL for the bombing. Later reports and allegations in July 2015 pointed towards the involvement of the Dokumacılar, whom with which the bombings' prime suspect Orhan Gönder was allegedly a member of.

2015 Suruç bombing

On 20 July 2015, a suicide bombing in the Turkish district of Suruç, Şanlıurfa Province resulted in the death of 32 young activists who were planning to cross the border to help the relief efforts in the Syrian town of Kobanî. Kobanî had, until recently, been under siege by ISIL forces, though the YPG had gained control over most of the city by mid 2015. The youth activists were listening to a press statement when the explosion occurred, with the perpetrator being identified as Şeyh Abdurrahman Alagöz, who had entered Syria at the same time as Orhan Gönder to receive training in ISIL-led camps. The two were thus alleged to have been part of the Dokumacılar organisation.

See also
Turkey–ISIL conflict
Spillover of the Syrian Civil War
Military activities of ISIL

References

Factions of the Islamic State of Iraq and the Levant
Islamic organizations based in Turkey
Islamic terrorism in Turkey
Islamism in Turkey
Rebel groups in Turkey